Poa is a department or commune of Boulkiemdé Province in central Burkina Faso. As of 2005 it has a population of 30,406. Its capital lies at the town of Poa.

Towns and villages
PoaGogoLoagaMoungounissiNiangdoNoéssinRaloSogpelcéYaoguinYargo-Yarcés

References

Departments of Burkina Faso
Boulkiemdé Province